Aishath Reesha (born May 31, 1989) is a Maldivian track runner. She competed in the 800 metres at the 2008 Summer Olympics in Beijing. Reesha ran in the first round of the competition, with her personal best time of 12.52 seconds, but failed to qualify into the semi-finals.

References

External links
 
 
 
NBC Olympics Profile

1989 births
Living people
People from Malé
Maldivian female middle-distance runners
Olympic athletes of the Maldives
Athletes (track and field) at the 2008 Summer Olympics
World Athletics Championships athletes for the Maldives